Olinga is an album by vibraphonist Milt Jackson recorded in 1974 and released on the CTI label.

Reception
The Allmusic review by Scott Yanow awarded the album 3 stars stating "this set features vibraphonist Milt Jackson with some of his favorite musicians... The performances are pretty straight-ahead for CTI... Although Cedar Walton does not sound as formidable on electric piano as on acoustic and the other solos overall are a bit safe, this is a nice album".

Track listing
All compositions by Milt Jackson except where noted
 "Olinga" (Dizzy Gillespie) - 3:47 
 "Re-Rev" (Jimmy Heath, Jackson) - 6:08 
 "The Metal Melter" (Heath, Jackson) - 6:19 
 "The Steel Bender" - 5:27 
 "Lost April" (Eddie DeLange, Emil Newman, Hubert Spencer) - 4:35 
 "I'm Not So Sure" (Cedar Walton) - 8:35 
 "The Metal Melter" [alternate take] (Heath, Jackson) - 6:13 Bonus track on CD reissue 
 "The Steel Bender" [alternate take] - 5:10 Bonus track on CD reissue
Recorded at Van Gelder Studio in Englewood Cliffs, New Jersey on January 9 & 10, 1974

Personnel
Milt Jackson – vibes
Jimmy Heath - soprano saxophone
Cedar Walton - piano
Ron Carter - bass
Mickey Roker - drums
Arnold Black, Harry Cykman, Max Ellen, Emanuel Green, Harold Kohon, Harry Lookofsky, David Nadien, Irving Spice - violin (tracks 1 & 5)
Jesse Levy, Charles McCracken, George Ricci, Alan Shulman - cello (tracks 1 & 5)
Bob James - arranger, conductor (tracks 1 & 5)

References 

CTI Records albums
Milt Jackson albums
Albums produced by Creed Taylor
1974 albums
Albums recorded at Van Gelder Studio